János Gyöngyösi (born as János Heller, 3 May 1893 –  29 October 1951) was a Hungarian politician, who served as Minister of Foreign Affairs between 1944 and 1947.

Biography
He fought in the First World War. After the war, he worked as a journalist and finished his studies in the Budapest University (now Eötvös Loránd University). During the Second World War he was a reserve officer in Debrecen, near the Hungarian-Romanian border.

In 1931 Gyöngyösi joined the Smallholders Party. From 1944 he supported the Allies and the Red Army in his articles and called on the Hungarian home defence soldiers to capitulate. He became Minister of Foreign Affairs in the illegitimate Interim National Government.  He could be minister because he was in good terms with leading politicians of the Soviet Union. However, Gyöngyösi realised the superpower's real intentions that helping Hungary may not be their best interests at heart. That's why he switched to strengthening ties with the Western powers (US, UK). In 1947 Gyöngyösi signed the Treaty of Paris. As a result, Hungary again lost large parts of its territory, for example Northern-Transylvania. Gyöngyösi's political career was doomed when Ferenc Nagy had to resign.

References
 Magyar Életrajzi Lexikon

1893 births
1951 deaths
People from Prešov District
Hungarians in Slovakia
Independent Smallholders, Agrarian Workers and Civic Party politicians
Foreign ministers of Hungary
Members of the National Assembly of Hungary (1945–1947)
Members of the National Assembly of Hungary (1947–1949)
Members of the National Assembly of Hungary (1949–1953)